John Blair Balfour, 1st Baron Kinross  (11 July 1837 – 22 January 1905) was a Scottish lawyer and Liberal politician who sat in the House of Commons from 1880 to 1899.

Early life
Balfour was born in the manse at Clackmannan, the son of Rev. Peter Balfour ("Perpendicular Peter"), minister of Clackmannan and his wife Jane Ramsay Blair, daughter of John Blair.

He was educated at the Edinburgh Academy and then studied law at Edinburgh University, becoming an advocate of the Scottish bar in 1861.

Career

He served as Advocate Depute from 1870 to 1872, and in 1880 was made a Queen's Counsel. He was a Deputy Lieutenant for Edinburgh.
 
At the 1880 general election, Balfour stood unsuccessfully for parliament at Ayrshire North but in a by election six months later was elected Liberal Member of Parliament for Clackmannan and Kinross.

He was appointed Solicitor General for Scotland in 1880 and in 1881 he succeeded this appointment by becoming Lord Advocate, a post he held for four years. In 1882 he became a Privy Counsellor. He served as the elected Dean of the Faculty of Advocates twice: from 1885 to 1886, and from 1889 to 1892.

In 1892, on the return of the Liberals to power, Balfour was again appointed Lord Advocate, finally resigning on the fall of Lord Rosebery's government in 1895. In 1899 he was appointed Lord Justice General of Scotland and Lord President of the Court of Session.

In the 1902 Coronation Honours list it was announced that he would receive a barony, and on 15 July 1902 he was created Baron Kinross, of Glascune in the County of Haddingtonshire. He took the oath and his seat in the House of Lords the following month, on 7 August.

Personal life

On 4 August 1869 Balfour married Lilias Oswald Mackenzie daughter of Donald Mackenzie, styled Lord Mackenzie, a Lord of Session, and Janet Alice Mitchell. They had one son who lived with the family and was trained as an advocate:

 Patrick Balfour, 2nd Baron Kinross (1870–1939), who married Caroline Elsie Johnstone-Douglas, a daughter of Arthur Johnstone-Douglas.

After the death of his first wife, he married secondly the Hon. Marianne Eliza Moncrieff in 1877. Marianne was a daughter of James Moncreiff, 1st Baron Moncreiff. Together, they were the parents of five children, four sons and one daughter, including:

 Hon. James Moncreiffe Balfour (1878–1960), who married Madeline Maude Graham Watson, daughter of James Graham Watson (brother-in-law of Sir Robert Tuite Boothby), in 1908.
 Hon. John Ramsay Blair Balfour (1881–1964), a Lt.-Cdr. om the Royal Navy who died unmarried.
 Hon. Harry Robert Chichester Balfour (1882–1964), who married Dorothy Constance Chetwynd, a daughter of Henry Goulburn Willoughby Chetwynd and Eva Constance Elizabeth Fanny Berney, in 1921.
 Hon. Norman Frederick William Balfour (1884–1954), the Vicar of Leafield who died unmarried.
 Hon. Isobel Nora Gwendoline Balfour (1885–1961), who married Capt. Percival Henry Havelock Bailey, in 1908.

Lord Kinross died 22 January 1905, at his home at 6 Rothesay Terrace in Edinburgh, and was buried in the "Lords Row" in Dean Cemetery, Edinburgh. His descendants are buried with him.

Notes

References

External links

Kinross, John Balfour, 1st Baron
Kinross, John Balfour, 1st Baron
Kinross, John Balfour, 1st Baron
Members of the Parliament of the United Kingdom for Scottish constituencies
Lord Advocates
Solicitors General for Scotland
Scottish Liberal Party MPs
UK MPs 1880–1885
UK MPs 1885–1886
UK MPs 1886–1892
UK MPs 1892–1895
UK MPs 1895–1900
UK MPs who were granted peerages
Lords President of the Court of Session
Lords Justice-General
Members of the Judicial Committee of the Privy Council
Burials at the Dean Cemetery
Blair Balfour
People educated at Edinburgh Academy
Alumni of the University of Edinburgh
Scottish King's Counsel
19th-century King's Counsel
People from Clackmannanshire
Deputy Lieutenants of Edinburgh
Members of the Faculty of Advocates
Members of the Privy Council of the United Kingdom
John, 1st Baron Kinross
Deans of the Faculty of Advocates
Peers created by Edward VII